Roman Yuriyovych Lyopka (born 26 January 1997) is a Ukrainian professional football goalkeeper who plays for Karpaty Lviv.

Career 
Lyopka is a product of UOR Simferopol Youth Sportive School System.

He made his debut for FC Zirka in the game against FC Poltava on 15 November 2014 in the Ukrainian First League.

References

External links 
 
 

1997 births
Living people
People from Pervomaisk, Mykolaiv Oblast
Ukrainian footballers
FC Zirka Kropyvnytskyi players
FC Nyva Vinnytsia players
FC Inhulets Petrove players
FC Kryvbas Kryvyi Rih players
FC Karpaty Lviv players
Association football goalkeepers
Ukrainian Premier League players
Ukrainian First League players
Ukrainian Second League players
Sportspeople from Mykolaiv Oblast